WOQI (1020 AM, "Radio Casa Pueblo") is a Community radio station licensed to serve Adjuntas, Puerto Rico.  The station is owned by Radio Casa Pueblo, Inc. The station was the first to operate entirely with Renewable energy. It airs a Spanish non-profit variety format.

The station was assigned the WOQI call letters by the Federal Communications Commission on March 20, 2001.

References

External links
WOQI official website

OQI
Radio stations established in 1989
Community radio stations
Adjuntas, Puerto Rico
Environmental mass media
Nature conservation organizations based in Puerto Rico
1989 establishments in Puerto Rico